"Trouble Me" is a song by the American alternative rock group 10,000 Maniacs and the first single from their 1989 album Blind Man's Zoo. The single was co-written by the band's then-lead singer, Natalie Merchant, as dedication to her father, Anthony Merchant. "Trouble Me" charted in both the United States and the United Kingdom, becoming a hit for the band. A live version with lead vocalist Mary Ramsey was also included on their 2016 album Playing Favorites.

Background and production
"Trouble Me", composed by Dennis Drew and lyricized by Natalie Merchant, was the first released single of the album. The song was written for Merchant's father, Anthony, who was hospitalized at the time. Gospel singer Jevetta Steele provided the background vocals for the song. Merchant said in late 1980s, "The most uplifting song is 'Trouble Me', which seems like the antidote for all the rest of [Blind Man's Zoo]."

Music video
A music video for "Trouble Me" was produced, containing outdoor scenes. Merchant caught a common cold during the filming. It is included in the VHS release 10,000 Maniacs: Time Capsule, Filmed 1982–1990, later re-released on DVD as 10,000 Maniacs: Time Capsule, Filmed 1982–1993.

In the music video, while she performs the song in various scenes, Merchant takes an elderly woman on the bicycle to the place where her friends surprise her and then do activities. In the end, Merchant and the elderly woman ride on the bicycle to a shoreline.

Reception
Music critic Anthony DeCurtis wrote, "Blind Man's Zoo, [which includes the song], is a starkly pessimistic statement." Chris Willman of Los Angeles Times reviewed the band's song performance at the 1989 Santa Barbara Bowl concert, calling it "honey in the soothing." Joseph Pryweller of Virginia's Daily Press reviewed the band's song performance at a 1989 Colonial Williamsburg concert, saying that the performance resembled songs from the band's previous album, In My Tribe, and "lacked special character."

Charts
In the Billboard charts, "Trouble Me" reached number 20 in the Mainstream Rock chart on the week ending July 8, 1989; number three in the Modern Rock Tracks chart on the week ending June 10; number 44 in the Hot 100 chart on the week ending August 12; and number seven in the Adult Contemporary chart on the week ending August 19, 1989. "Trouble Me" reached number 77 in the UK Singles Chart for the week ending June 17, 1989.

In popular culture
The song is featured in the Dead of Summer episode, "Barney Rubble Eyes" (season 1, episode 2). Billboard reviewer Chuck Taylor said that the "[m]idtempo pacing" of James Blunt's song "1973" would resemble 10,000 Maniacs' song.

References

1989 singles
1989 songs
10,000 Maniacs songs
Songs written by Natalie Merchant
Songs written by Dennis Drew
Song recordings produced by Peter Asher
Elektra Records singles